Sledging Col is a col between Mount Griffith and a very low peak on its northeast side, in the Hays Mountains. The col provides a sledging route from Scott Glacier to the head of Koerwitz Glacier and thence northward. So named by members of New Zealand Geological Survey Antarctic Expedition (NZGSAE) who used this route in 1969-70 when the west side of the lower reaches of Scott Glacier were found to be impassable.

Mountain passes of the Ross Dependency
Amundsen Coast